'Ritzen Group, Inc. v. Jackson Masonry, LLC, 589 U.S. ___ (2020)' was a United States Supreme Court case from the October 2019 term. In a unanimous opinion, the Supreme Court ruled that "when the bankruptcy court unreservedly grants or denies relief", in this case on a motion for relief from an automatic stay, that decision presents a final order that may be appealed. In a 12-page opinion the Court relied upon its own precedent in Bullard v. Blue Hills Bank to affirm the court below.

Background
Ritzen Group, Inc. agreed to buy land in Nashville, Tennessee from Jackson Masonry, LLC but the land sale was never effected. Ritzen sued for breach of contract in state court but, just days before the trial, Jackson filed for bankruptcy which triggered the automatic stay provision for all lawsuits. Ritzen sued in federal court asking that the state court be compelled to hear the case arguing that the bankruptcy was filed in bad faith.

References

External links 

 

United States Supreme Court cases
United States Supreme Court cases of the Roberts Court
2019 in United States case law
United States bankruptcy case law
History of Nashville, Tennessee